Heritage Museum, also known as Lok Virsa Museum is a museum administered and managed by Lok Virsa - National Institute of Folk & Traditional Heritage.  It is a museum of history and culture in Islamabad, Pakistan, located on the Shakarparian Hills showcasing the living cultures of Pakistan. The museum opened in 1974 and became an autonomous institute in 2002 following the Lok Virsa Legal Status Ordinance, 2002. The museum consists of several buildings as well as an outdoor museum which can accommodate up to 3000 visitors.

Features
The museum covers an area of 60,000 sq. ft. featuring several exhibit halls, making it the largest museum in Pakistan. Lok Virsa is commonly called the "Museum for the people of Pakistan", who the museum calls "the real bearers of our cultural traditions".

Pakistan National Museum of Ethnology
The Pakistan National Museum of Ethnology (or Folk Heritage Museum) was originally established in 1982 as the "Folk Art Museum". The museum showcases Pakistan's multicultural society by displaying history and living traditions of the various ethnic groups of Pakistan from all corners of the country. The museum covers an area of 20,000 square feet and in 2004 underwent renovations and was renamed. The museum is open from 10:00 am to 7:00 pm from Sunday to Thursday and Saturday. On Friday, the museum closes for one hour between 1:00 pm to 2:00 pm. The museum is closed on Mondays.

It displays the cultural heritage of Pakistani people. The living style of the different areas of Pakistan is exhibited here in statues, pictures, pottery, music and textile work. Lok Virsa is the finest cultural museum in Pakistan. It showcases art works that help in preserving the living folk and traditional culture and crafts of Pakistan. It is located near Shakarparian Hills and has a large display of embroidered costumes, jewellery, woodwork, metalwork, block printing, ivory and bone work. Traditional architecture facades exhibiting such skills as fresco, mirror work and marble inlay; tile, mosaic and stucco tracery are also displayed. Adjacent to the Lok Virsa Museum, the Lok Virsa Heritage Reference Library is well equipped with resource data on ethnography, anthropology, folk music, art, history and crafts. Books on culture, heritage, audio and video-cassettes of folk and classical vocal and instrumental music are available for sale at Lok Virsa's sales centre.

This museum is highly recommended to school teachers to arrange and plan their field trips so that their students can learn to appreciate art, culture and their heritage. A great place to visit for families and their out-of-town visiting guests.

Sufis and Shrines Hall
In 2013, a Sufis and Shrines Hall was established within the Pakistan National Museum of Ethnology, popularly known as the Heritage Museum.

In this hall, there are pictures of musicians standing in performing postures singing poetry of sufi saints like Lal Shahbaz Qalandar, Shah Abdul Latif Bhittai and Sachal Sarmast. Also on display are pictures of shrines of Data Ganj Bakhsh, Shah Rukne Alam and Bahauddin Zakariya.

Lok Virsa has also published a series of books on sufi saints like Bulleh Shah, Sultan Bahu, Waris Shah and Mian Muhammad Bakhsh.

Pakistan Monument Museum

The Pakistan Monument Museum was established in 2010 to pay tribute to all those who worked and sacrificed everything for the Independence of Pakistan. The museum depicts ancient civilizations, the freedom struggle of Pakistan, the birth of Pakistan and major achievements of the country. It also facilities a reference library, audio-visual archive, conference hall along with a sixty-two seat capacity auditorium known as Panorama Hall.

Lok Virsa Library
The Lok Virsa Library (or Heritage Library) consists of over 32,000 books, journals, manuscripts and field reports pertaining to Pakistani folklore, ethnology, cultural anthropology, art history and craft as well as over 200 books published by Lok Virsa. The library is devoted to serve students, researchers and scholars in connection with their research work on cultural heritage of Pakistan, as well as the general public. The library provides valuable intangible benefits as a source of national, regional, and local identity. Numerous manuscripts, original research reports, field surveys and monographs on Pakistani culture are accessible to the public.

Virsa Research & Publication Centre
The Virsa Research & Publication Centre conducts field surveys particularly in the rural regions to record oral traditions. Lok Virsa has the mandate to document traditional heritage at the regional, district and sub-district level. Since the institute has currently no branches in other regions, a network of writers, scholars, universities, colleges and schools has been involved to carry out the task at the regional level. Towards this end, Lok Virsa commissions research projects and papers on significant aspects of our culture to students from different universities and colleges and also funds independent research studies. It conducts and commissions research in all sub-fields of folk and traditional heritage such as folk songs, folktales, games and celebrations. It publishes books on various facets of Pakistani folklore and cultural heritage covering all provinces and regions of Pakistan. The findings are later compiled in reports and then published in books, which are later sold by Lok Virsa and freely available at the Lok Virsa Library. Many of these are national award-winning books and a number of these are prescribed at the postgraduate level.

Virsa Media Centre
The Virsa Media Centre undertakes recordings to focus on traditional music and cultural heritage. It has helped edit, compile and produce a set of fifty one cultural documentaries and three thousand hours of audio recordings. A professional state-of-the-art studio is operational and so are the mobile units which are well-equipped to capture/record event in any part of the country. Lok Virsa is one of the largest publishers of the traditional music and culture. Audio and video cassettes, CDs, VCDs and DVDs produced by Lok Virsa are available in the market. Lok Virsa has edited, complied and produced a set of 36 cultural documentaries and over 500 audio cassette labels of nation's cultural heritage. A professional video studio has been established by the center at Islamabad. The equipped mobile units of the center can reach any part of the country to capture an event. The center offers professional documentaries and video programs to television networks, universities and other institutions on rental as well as on sale basis. It also markets its productions on CDs and DVDs for home consumption.

Objectives
The objectives of Lok Virsa are,
 Engage in research, systematic collection, documentation, scientific preservation, projection and dissemination of oral traditions, folklore and other aspects of indigenous cultural heritage.
 Strengthen and nurture the roots of Pakistani culture and achieve fundamental objectives regarding its re-discovery and re-interpretation to project the true identity of Pakistan as a nation.
 Establish cultural complexes and museums for the purpose of displaying living arts and crafts, cultural artifacts and rare objects from all parts of Pakistan.
 Establish cultural industries, art and craft galleries, artisan villages and hold and organize festivals.
 Retrieve advance knowledge from the general public for promotion of cultural heritage and cultural industries of Pakistan.
 Carry out studies, investigations, surveys, collect data to prepare feasibility report about schemes, projects and programs to the extent required for fulfilling the objectives.
 Arrange and provide training and technical assistance to its staff as well as participating NGOs and community-based organizations, educational institutions through training programs, purchase of existing services, workshops, seminars, publications and training programs, scholarships within Pakistan or in such other countries as the Board may deem appropriate.
 Improve knowledge, understanding and practices of different aspects of indigenous cultural heritage and devise ways and means for a broader dissemination through employment of modern media technology.

 Minister, Shafqat Mahmood, Ministry of Culture and Literary Heritage.
 Secretary, Ministry of Culture and Literary Heritage, Dr. Nadeem Shafiq Malik.
 Executive Director, To be Selected.
 Any 5 selected members

See also
List of museums in Pakistan
National Institute of Cultural Studies, Islamabad

References

External links 

virsacollection.com

Art museums and galleries in Pakistan
Art museums established in 1974
Islamabad
Living museums
Museums in Pakistan
Rural history museums in Asia
Tourism in Islamabad
Tourism in Pakistan
1974 establishments in Pakistan